Rivers Hoopers is a Nigerian basketball team based in Port Harcourt, Rivers. The team plays in the Nigerian Premier League. Established in 2009 as Royal Hoopers, the team has played in the Premier League since its inception. Hoopers have won the national championship four times, with titles in 2011, 2012, 2019 and 2021.

History
The club was established in 2009 as Royal Hoopers, with Ogoh Odaudu at the reins as head coach. The team won its first NPL championship in 2011.

In December 2018, Hoopers played in the FIBA Africa Zone 3 Championship and won all five games to emerge as its Champions and went on to play in the 2019 Africa Basketball League in March. On 17 November 2019, the Hoopers won its third Nigerian title when it beat Raptors in the final. With this achievement, the team qualified directly for the inaugural season of Basketball Africa League (BAL). 

To strengthen the team for the inaugural BAL season, the Hoopers acquired former NBA-player Ben Uzoh and Festus Ezeli. Ezeli, however, got injured before the season and did not join. Hoopers finished third in Group A of the BAL, beating only GNBC from Madagascar. Uzoh led the team in scoring with 14.7 points.

In the 2021 season, the Hoopers won the Premier League for a fourth time after edging Gombe Bulls in the final. Anaiye Johnson was named the league's MVP. However, the Hoopers were denied to play in the BAL by FIBA Africa, that cited the organised league was invalid.

Honours
Nigerian Premier League
Champions (4): 2011, 2012, 2019, 2021
Crown Elite Basketball Championship
Champions (1): 2022

In African competitions
FIBA Africa Clubs Champions Cup  (3 appearances)
2010 – Ninth Place
2011 – Eleventh Place
2018–19 – Group Stage
Basketball Africa League (1 appearance)
2020 – Group Stage

Players

Current roster
The following roster was the Rivers Hoopers team in the 2021 BAL season.

Notable players 

 Chris Obekpa (2022) – Nigerian international and former BAL blocking leader.
 Ben Uzoh (2021) – Nigerian international and former Toronto Raptors player.
 Robinson Opong (2021) – Ugandan international.
 Abdul Yahaya (2019–2020) – Two-time Nigerian League MVP.

Individual awards 
Premier League MVP

 Abdul Yahaya – 2015, 2019
 Johnson Anaiye – 2021

Premier League Final MVP

 Victor Anthony Koko – 2021

References

External links
Official website
Twitter profile

Basketball teams in Nigeria
Sport in Port Harcourt
Basketball teams established in 2009
2009 establishments in Nigeria
Basketball Africa League teams